"Congratulations" (sometimes known by its Icelandic title of "Til hamingju Ísland", (")) was the  entry in the Eurovision Song Contest 2006, performed in English by Silvía Night.

Composition 
Composed by Þorvaldur Bjarni Þorvaldsson and with lyrics written by the fictional character singing it, the song generated considerable controversy at the contest. The lyrics are essentially in praise of the wisdom of the Icelandic voters in selecting Silvía to represent them in the first place. She sings, for example, "so congratulations, I have arrived / I'm Silvía Night and I'm shining so bright / Eurovision nation, your dream's coming true / you've been waiting and waiting for me to save you", thus contending that the other entries of that year are things to be saved from. Silvía's song, on the other hand, is described as being "hot, okay, really not too gay". The Icelandic original continued this theme further, with one line running "congratulations Iceland, that I was born here". Silvía also sings "let's meet next year in Iceland", a reference to the contest tradition of hosting rights going to the previous year's winner.

Controversy 
The controversy came, however, with the line "the vote is in, I'll fucking win", a contravention of the contest's policy on expletives (although a previous French entry had contained an obscenity in French, this was the first occasion on which an English-language one was to be heard). Contest executive supervisor Svante Stockselius formally informed the Icelandic delegation that the lyrics as written were in violation of the rules, however Silvía claimed at her press conferences that she would "fucking say what I fucking want". One set of lyrics published online featured the line "they say I win", prior to the formal objection being lodged.

Over the course of the rehearsals, Silvía continued to perform the lyrics as originally written. Her second dress rehearsal also featured abuse of the floor manager, whom she called a "fucking retard". According to the BBC commentator at the semi-final, this last remark was misheard by some as "fucking Greek", a slight on Athens, where the contest was being held. Thus, when the song was eventually performed in the semi-final, it was greeted with jeers from much of the audience.

In the event, the lyrics were changed to "the vote is in, I'll freaking win"; however, the official CD of the contest entries had already been pressed with the original lyrics.

Commentary both before and after Silvía's performance stressed the fact that she was a television character, rather than a real person. Her entire appearance, therefore, was in fact something of a joke at the expense of the contest – something Silvía herself picked up on when arguing at a press conference that people intending to enter the contest as a joke should not do so.

Eurovision Song Contest

Söngvakeppni Sjónvarpsins 2006 
Söngvakeppni Sjónvarpsins 2006 was the national final format developed by RÚV in order to select Iceland's entry for the Eurovision Song Contest 2006. Twenty-four songs in total competed in Söngvakeppni Sjónvarpsins 2006 where the winner was determined after three semi-finals and a final. Eight songs competed in each semi-final on 21 January, 28 January and 4 February 2006. The top four songs from each semi-final qualified to the final which took place on 3 February 2007. The results of the semi-finals and final were determined by 100% public televoting, while two wildcard acts were selected by a jury for the final out of the fifth-placed acts from each of the semi-finals. All songs were required to be performed in Icelandic during all portions of the competition, however, it was decided that the language choice would be up to the winning composers to decide the language that will be performed at the Eurovision Song Contest in Athens.

On 30 October 2005, RÚV opened the submission period for interested songwriters to submit their entries until the deadline on 18 November 2005. Songwriters were required to be Icelandic or possess Icelandic citizenship. At the close of the submission deadline, 226 entries were received. A selection committee was formed in order to select the top twenty-four entries. The twenty-four competing songs were revealed by the broadcaster during a press conference on 13 December 2005, while their artists were revealed on 16, 17 and 20 January 2006.

"Til hamingju Ísland" competed in the third semi-final, and was announced as one of five qualifiers.

The final took place on 18 February 2006 where the fifteen entries that qualified from the preceding three semi-finals competed. "Til hamingju Ísland" would win the final with 70,190 votes, winning by over 40,000 votes. As a result, the song would go on to represent Iceland in the Eurovision Song Contest 2006.

At Eurovision 
As Iceland had not qualified for the final at the 2005 contest, the song had to compete in the semi-final. Here, it was performed twenty-third, following 's Hari Mata Hari with "Lejla". At the close of voting, it had received 62 points, placing 13th in a field of 23 – failing to qualify for the final and thus forcing Iceland's next contest appearance to be in the semi-final.

Charts

References

External links

Eurovision songs of Iceland
Eurovision songs of 2006
2006 songs
Number-one singles in Iceland